Chandrashekhar Ganpatrao Sonwane (born May 2, 1972) is an Indian American scientist who works in the fields of space launch, air breathing propulsion and chemical and power industries.

Early life and education
Sonawane  graduated with a Bachelor of Science in chemical engineering from the Institute of Chemical Technology, Mumbai. In 1996, he received Master of Science in chemical engineering from the Indian Institute of Technology, Mumbai, India. He completed a PhD in chemical engineering from the University of Queensland in 2000.

References 

Living people
People from Nanded
Indian scientists
Institute of Chemical Technology alumni
IIT Bombay alumni
American people of Marathi descent
Year of birth missing (living people)